A teenybopper is an early teenage girl who follows adolescent trends in music, fashion, and culture. The term may have been coined by marketing professionals and psychologists, later becoming a subculture of its own.  The term was introduced in the 1950s to refer to teenagers who mainly listened to popular music and/or rock and roll and not much else. Teenybopper became widely used again in the late 1960s and early 1970s, following an increase in the marketing of pop music, teen idols and fashions aimed specifically at younger girls, generally 10–15 years old.

Subcultural aspects

The subculture is exclusive to early adolescent girls. As a subculture, it is a retreat, allowing girls to relate to their peers and have "girl culture" without male mockery.  While the subculture allows girls to have a space of their own with their peers, the subculture magazines also offer idealized teen idols, allowing girls to fantasize about future marriage.

The narrative fantasies elaborated around teenyboppers serve as distractions for aspects of life felt to be unrewarding, such as school or work.  When shared with other teenyboppers, it allows for defensive solidarity.  It allows its members to define themselves apart from younger and older girls.

It has a commercial origin and is "an almost packaged cultural commodity", emerging from the pop business and relying on commercial magazines and TV.  As a result, it has fewer creative elements than other subcultures.

Membership has very few restrictions, does not require elaborate spending, and requires much less expertise and money than certain school activities.  The subculture is suited to being followed at school or home, and girls can hold a party with just a bedroom, a music player, and permission to invite friends.

Musical preferences
In the 1960s, a new type of music appeared, different from the Tin Pan Alley music school, but molded by it.  It was no longer written by the old established songwriters of Tin Pan Alley, but by young people.  They helped to establish the new teen idols and wrote the so-called "teeny bopper songs", which "blend soft rock with pop ballad".

The difference that the 70s' "Teeny Bopper syndrome" had with prior idol phenomena was that these new teen idols were directed at even younger girls, down to 15 years old, who were too young to have heard The Beatles and were not attracted to the new hard rock music of the time that their elder siblings listened to.  This new market has a quick turnover potential and it boosted the benefits of many broadcasting companies.

The teenybopper idol image is that of the young boy next door, with "girlish" looks and singing about longing for romance. Their music is consumed by young girls, who collect posters and pin ups.

See also
 Adolescence
 Tween
 Bobby soxer
 Bubblegum pop
 Teen pop
 Disney Channel
 Nickelodeon
 Yé-yé

References

Further reading

 
 
 
 .
 

Social groups
Youth culture in the United States
Age-related stereotypes
1950s neologisms